Kerchove is the surname of the following people

Charles de Kerchove de Denterghem (1819-1882), Belgian engineer and politician
Constant de Kerchove de Denterghem (1790-1865), Belgian liberal politician
Derrick de Kerchove (born in 1944), Canadian writer and professor
Gilles de Kerchove (born in 1956), Belgian senior European Union official
Marthe de Kerchove de Denterghem (1877-1956), Belgian feminist
Oswald de Kerchove de Denterghem (1844-1906), Belgian liberal politician